Yuen Long Kau Hui is an area in Yuen Long, Yuen Long District, in the western New Territories of Hong Kong.

Geography

Yuen Long Kau Hui is located in the north-east of the present Yuen Long Town. It is sited south of a small hill and directly north of Yuen Long MTR station. It comprises several villages, which are part of the Shap Pat Heung Rural Committee. From West to East:
 Sai Pin Wai or Sai Bin Wai, a walled village
 Nam Pin Wai or Nam Bin Wai, a walled village
 Tung Tau Tsuen
 Tsoi Uk Tsuen or Choi Uk Tsuen
 Ying Lung Wai, a walled village
 Tai Wai Tsuen, a walled village
 Wong Uk Tsuen
And also:
 Shan Pui Tsuen, located north of the hill. A small boat near the village entrance serves as a ferry across the Shan Pui River towards Nam Sang Wai in the north.
 Tai Kiu Tsuen, located west of the main group of villages and across the river, directly south of Long Ping MTR station.

History

Market

The original Yuen Long Town was not located in the busiest place of present-day Yuen Long, namely Yuen Long Main Road, part of Castle Peak Road. The earliest market in Yuen Long was established and developed in the late Ming dynasty (1368–1644) south of the main road, in Tai Kiu Tun near Tai Kei Leng. The Coastal ban caused the evacuation of most of the population of present-day Hong Kong and lasted eight years in Yuen Long. In 1669, during the reign of the Kangxi Emperor in the Qing dynasty, that eight-year ban was lifted. The same year, the market was moved north to the area now known as Yuen Long Kau Hui. This was done for political reasons. The Market was set up by Tang Man-wai, a 23rd generation member of the Tang Clan of Kam Tin. He was a district magistrate of Longyou County in Zhejiang Province. While it is far from the coast today, it was beside the seashore when the market was first built.

Agricultural produce and daily necessities for inhabitants in western New Territories were sold at the market. Farmers, boat people and traders came from as far as the nearby coastal districts of Guangdong Province. Shop houses, inns, residential houses and temples with street sellers clustered along the streets made it a commercial as well as a cultural centre. Temples were built for worship and to judge disputes. Special market days, xuri, were scheduled on the 3rd, 6th and 9th days of the three ten-day periods of each lunar month. The market operated from 6 in the morning until dusk. Two entrance gates, one in the east, Tung Mun, and one in the south, Nam Mun, were locked up after the market hours to guard against theft and robbery. At its peak in the early 20th century, the Hui had around one hundred shops. The market was
managed by the Kwong Yu Tong, a trust of a branch of the Tangs in
Kam Tin.

After the British leased the New Territories in 1898, they built Castle Peak Road to connect major areas of the New Territories and Kowloon. The villagers proposed and moved the market town to the main road across the river. Yuen Long San Hui, was established in 1915 and after WWII the business of Yuen Long Kau Hui declined and most of the shops closed.

Villages

Sai Pin Wai is located on the western side of the market. It consists mainly of five rows of houses facing west. The village was set up by the Tangs of Kam Tin probably in the 17th century. It later became a multi-clan village inhabited by many Punti families surnamed Ng, Lau, Fan, Tang, Cheng, Leung, Wong and Lam. The Lams settled in the village in 1626 coming from Xixiang of Baoan, Guangdong Province.

Nam Pin Wai was set up by members of the Tang Clan.

Tung Tau Tsuen is so called because it is located in the east of the old Yuen Long Kau Hui market. It was established in the 17th century by the members of several clans, the Chans being the major one, and others being the Loks and the Lis from Dongguan. The village was originally called Chan Lok Li Tsuen. Ss. Peter and Paul Church, located at No. 201 Castle Peak Road in Yuen Long near Shui Pin Tsuen, was originally built in 1925 in Tung Tau Tsuen. It was relocated and rebuilt on the present Castle Peak Road site in 1958.

Choi Uk Tsuen.

Ying Lung Wai was established by a branch of the Kam Tin Tangs, who were originally in Nam Pin Wai but moved to the area to establish the village due to feng shui reasons.

Tai Wai Tsuen was founded by the Wong clan and the Choi clan around the early 16th century.

Wong Uk Tsuen 

Shan Pui Tsuen was founded by Lam Siu-yuen, a 13th generation member of the Lam Clan, who moved from Tai Wai Tsuen some 200 years ago.

Tai Kiu Tsuen was so named because a stone bridge was located at its west. It was established some 400 years ago by four clans: the Chan, the Tang, the Tse and the Leung. The Tangs probably came from Ping Shan and the Chans from Bao'an of Guangdong Province.

Villages alliance

The Tung Tau alliance or "Joint Meeting Group of Seven Villages" is an alliance of seven villages: Nam Pin Wai, Tung Tau Tsuen, Tsoi Uk Tsuen, Ying Lung Wai, Shan Pui Tsuen, Wong Uk Tsuen and Tai Wai Tsuen. The Yi Shing Temple in Wong Uk Tsuen (see below) is an alliance temple of the Tung Tau Alliance.

Features

Cheung Shing Street was one of the busiest streets of the market. It separates Nam Pin Wai and Sai Pin Wai. Two other notable streets, Lee Yick Street and Wine Street connect with Cheung Shing Street. The three streets formed the centre of the market.

Nam Mun Hau is a built-up area located at the south of Cheung Shing Street, next to the former southern gate (Nam Mun). It was at the bank of a branch of the Shan Pui River, where boats anchored for the market-goers to do trading at the market. Several shops were located there.

Temples
 
Tai Wong Temple, a Grade I Historic Building, in Cheung Shing Street. Probably built between 1662–1722. It is the main temple of Nam Pin Wai as well as Yuen Long Kau Hui. It was built for the worship of Hung Shing and Yeung Hau. Other than for worship, the temple was a venue for solving disputes and discussing market affairs among the villagers. It also once served as a yamen and the officials lived there.

Yuen Kwan Yi Tai Temple, a Grade I Historic Building probably built in 1714 in Cheung Shing Street. Commonly known as Pak Tai Temple, it is dedicated to Yuen Tai/Pak Tai and Kwan Tai. The temple functions as an ancestral hall and a temple of Sai Pin Wai. Village meetings are also held there.

Kwun Yam Temple, a Grade II Historic Building in Tung Tau Tsuen. It is believed to have been built in 1712. It is connected with the Tin Hau Temple in the front and they are considered as one complex. Two statues of Heng and Ha Generals stand in front of the Kwun Yam altar as her guards. On the left bay is a statue of the God of Wealth for worship.

Yi Shing Temple, in Wong Uk Tsuen, conventionally called Tai Wong Temple. It is mainly for the worship of Hung Shing and Yeung Hau deities. While its construction year cannot be verified, a renovation was carried out in 1924. It still acts as an alliance temple of the Tung Tau Alliance formed by the seven villages around Tai Wai Tsuen. In the old days, the temple operated a credit society serving the alliance villages.

Other buildings

Chun Yuen Ngat, a former pawnshop, at No. 72 Cheung Shing Street. Founded by Tang Lim-ming of the Tang Clan, and father of Tang Pui-king, the pawnshop was originally located at Lee Yick Street and was moved to the present site in the 1910s. It operated until WWII, when the business of the market declined. 

Tung Yick Store, Nos. 20 A & 21 Lee Yick Street, a former inn providing accommodation to traveling merchants from other villages. The exact year of its construction is not known, but it is believed that it had existed before 1899.

Entrance Gate of Tai Wai Tsuen, originally built around the early 16th century, reconstructed in 1911. There is an Earth God niche inside the Entrance Gate building.

Lam Ancestral Hall, at No. 157 Shan Pui Tsuen, was probably built in the 19th century. The building was used as the classrooms of a school for teaching village children in the 1930s-1960s, and as classrooms of a kindergarten in 1967-1968.

Shophouses (tong-lau) of the early 20th century can be found at Nam Mun Hau (Nos. 33-35) and in Lee Yick Street (No. 3a).

Transportation
The area is served by the Yuen Long MTR station Exit A/B.

Education
Yuen Long Kau Hui is in Primary One Admission (POA) School Net 74. Within the school net are multiple aided schools (operated independently but funded with government money) and one government school: Yuen Long Government Primary School (元朗官立小學).

See also
 Tai Po Kau Hui
 Tuen Mun Kau Hui

References

External links

 Delineation of area of existing village Yuen Long Kau Hui (Shap Pat Heung) for election of resident representative (2019 to 2022)

Yuen Long
Areas of Hong Kong
Retail markets in Hong Kong
Shap Pat Heung